Japan competed in the 2009 East Asian Games which were held in Hong Kong, China from December 5, 2009 to December 13, 2009. Japan finished second on the medal table with 62 gold medals.

References

2009 East Asian Games
Japan at the East Asian Games
2009 in Japanese sport